1581 (MDLXXXI) was a common year starting on Sunday (link will display the full calendar) in the Julian calendar, and a common year starting on Thursday (link will display full calendar) of the Proleptic Gregorian calendar.

Events 

 January–June 
 March 18 – The Parliament of England's Act against Reconciliation to Rome imposes heavy fines, for practising Roman Catholicism.
 March 25 – Iberian Union: Philip II of Spain is crowned Philip I of Portugal.
 April 4 – Following his circumnavigation of the world, Francis Drake is knighted by Elizabeth I of England.

 July–December 
 July 14 – English Jesuit Edmund Campion is arrested.
 July 26 
The Northern Netherlands (Union of Utrecht) proclaim their independence from Spain in the Act of Abjuration, abjuring loyalty to Philip II of Spain as their sovereign, and appointing Francois, Duke of Anjou, as the new sovereign of the Netherlands; public practice of Roman Catholicism is forbidden.
Capture of Breda: Spanish troops take Breda by surprise. 
A meteorite makes landfall in Thuringia, Holy Roman Empire.
 August 28 – The army of King Stephen Báthory of Poland begins its siege of the Russian garrison of Pskov.
 Summer (probable) – Yermak begins the Russian conquest of the Khanate of Sibir, with a band of 1,636 men.
 September – A mercenary army of Sweden, under Pontus De la Gardie, captures Narva from Russia.
 October 10 – King Bayinnaung, who created the largest empire in mainland southeast Asia, dies at age 65.
 October 15 – Ballet Comique de la Reine, the first narrative ballet, devised by Louise of Lorraine, wife of Henry III of France, and choreographed by Balthasar de Beaujoyeulx, opens in its first performance at the court of Catherine de' Medici, in the Louvre Palace in Paris, as part of the wedding celebrations for Marguerite of Lorraine.
 November 4 – Jean de la Cassière is restored as Grandmaster of the Knights Hospitaller, by Pope Gregory XIII.
 December 1 – In England, Jesuit priest Edmund Campion is executed for treason.

 Date unknown 
 The Knights Hospitaller depose Jean de la Cassière as Grandmaster, and appoint Mathurin Romegas.
 The Ming Dynasty Chancellor of China, Chief Grand Secretary Zhang Juzheng, imposes the Single Whip Reform, by which taxes are assessed on properties recorded in the land census, and paid in silver, as the accepted medium of exchange.
 Oda Nobunaga invades Iga Province.
 The Trier witch trials begin.
 John Dee practices angel magic with Barnabas Saul, but with no success.
 Guru Arjan Dev becomes the fifth Guru of Sikhs, succeeding his father Guru Ram Das.
 The last Bishop of Meissen, John IX of Haugwitz, resigns his office in the wake of the Reformation.

Births 

 January 4 – James Ussher, Anglo-Irish priest and scholar (d. 1656)
 January 6 – Countess Palatine Dorothea of Simmern, Princess consort of Anhalt-Dessau (d. 1631)
 January 30 – Christian, Margrave of Brandenburg-Bayreuth (1603–1655) (d. 1655)
 February 17 – Fausto Poli, Italian Catholic prelate and cardinal (d. 1653)
 March 16 – Pieter Corneliszoon Hooft, Dutch historian (d. 1647)
 April 24 – Vincent de Paul, French Roman Catholic priest who dedicated himself to serving the poor (d. 1660)
 May 4 – Arnold Möller, German calligrapher (d. 1655)
 May 21 – Robert More, English politician (d. 1626)
 May 22 – Archduchess Gregoria Maximiliana of Austria, Austrian archduchess (d. 1597)
 June 21 – Edward Barrett, 1st Lord Barrett of Newburgh, English politician (d. 1645)
 June 27 – Louis Günther I, Count of Schwarzburg-Rudolstadt (1630–1646) (d. 1646)
 July 18 – Pier Luigi Carafa, Italian Catholic cardinal (d. 1655)
 July 20 – Isidoro Bianchi, Italian painter (d. 1662)
 July 25 – Brian Twyne, English archivist (d. 1644)
 August 5 – Hedwig of Denmark, Danish princess (d. 1641)
 August 15 – Jeremias Drexel, Jesuit writer of devotional literature and a professor of the humanities and rhetoric (d. 1638)
 September 21 – Simon Archer, English politician (d. 1662)
 September 27 – Juan Damián López de Haro, Spanish Catholic bishop of Puerto Rico (d. 1648)
 October 9 – Claude Gaspard Bachet de Méziriac, French mathematician (d. 1638)
 October 21 – Domenico Zampieri, Italian painter (d. 1641)
 November 1 – William Hockmere, English politician (d. 1626)
 November 11 – Edward Popham, English politician (d. 1641)
 November 18 – Carlo I Cybo-Malaspina, marquisate of Massa (d. 1662)
 November 26 – Frederick, Duke of Schleswig-Holstein-Sønderburg-Norburg (d. 1658)
 December 17 – Walter Davison, English poet (d. 1600)
 December 26 – Philip III, Landgrave of Hesse-Butzbach (1609–1643) (d. 1643)
 December 27 – Jean Chalette, French painter (d. 1643)
 date unknown
 Gasparo Aselli, Italian physician (d. 1626)
 Jeremias Drexel, German Jesuit writer of devotional literature
 Edmund Gunter, English mathematician (d. 1626)
 Jean du Vergier de Hauranne, French monk who introduced Jansenism into France (d. 1643)
 Charles Malapert, Belgian Jesuit writer (d. 1630)
Giulia Tofana, Italian poisoner (d. 1651)
 Łukasz Opaliński (1581–1654), Polish nobleman (d. 1654)
 Thomas Overbury, English poet and essayist (d. 1613)
 Johannes Rudbeckius, bishop at Västerås (d. 1646)
 Choghtu Khong Tayiji, ruler of the Khalkha Mongols (d. 1637)
 probable
 Juan Ruiz de Alarcón, Mexican dramatist (d. 1639)
 Sisto Badalocchio, Italian painter and engraver (d. 1647)

Deaths 

 January 22 – Joos de Damhouder, Flemish jurist (b. 1507)
 February 15 – Francisco Foreiro, Portuguese Dominican theologian and biblist (b. 1523)
 March 17 – Johann Marbach, German theologian (b. 1521)
 March 19 – Francis I, Duke of Saxe-Lauenburg (b. 1510)
 April 3 – Herbert Duifhuis, Dutch minister (b. 1531)
 April 25 – Okabe Motonobu, Japanese warrior
 May 31 – Jan Kostka, Polish noble (b. 1529)
 June 2 – James Douglas, 4th Earl of Morton, regent of Scotland (b. 1525)
 July 20 – Odet de Turnèbe, French dramatist (b. 1552)
 July 11 – Peder Skram, Danish senator and naval officer (b. 1500)
 July 12 – Johannes Gigas, German theologian (b. 1514)
 July 22 – Richard Cox, English bishop (b. 1500)
 August 17 – Duchess Sabine of Württemberg, by marriage Landgravine of Hesse-Kassel (b. 1549)
 August 20 – Katharina of Hanau, Countess of Wied, German noblewoman (b. 1525)
 August – King Mayadunne of Sitawaka (b. 1501)
 September 1 – Guru Ram Das, fourth Sikh Guru (b. 1534)
 September 16 – Peter Niers, notorious German bandit (date of birth unknown)
 September 28 – Achilles Statius, Portuguese humanist (b. 1524)
 September 29 – Andreas Musculus, German theologian (b. 1514)
 September 30 – Hubert Languet, French diplomat and reformer (b. 1518)
 October 4 – Henry Wriothesley, 2nd Earl of Southampton, English earl (b. 1545)
 October 7 – Honoré I, Lord of Monaco (b. 1522)
 October 9 –  Saint Louis Bertrand, Spanish missionary to Latin America, patron saint of Colombia (b. 1526)
 October 10 – King Bayinnaung of Burma (b. 1516)
 October 23 – Michael Neander, German mathematician and astronomer (b. 1529)
 November 4 – Mathurin Romegas, French rival Grandmaster of the Knights Hospitaller (b. c.1525)
 November 7 – Richard Davies, Welsh bishop and scholar (b. c. 1505)
 November 19 – Tsarevich Ivan Ivanovich of Russia (b. 1554)
 December 1
 Martyrs and executed of Tyburn
 Alexander Briant, English Jesuit priest and saint  (b. 1556)
 Edmund Campion, English Jesuit priest and saint  (b. 1540)
 Ralph Sherwin, English Roman Catholic priest and saint (b. 1550)
 December 11 – Maria of Austria, Duchess of Jülich-Cleves-Berg, daughter of Emperor Ferdinand I (b. 1531)
 December 21 – Jean de la Cassière, French-born Maltese 51st Grandmaster of the Knights Hospitaller (b. 1502) 
 date unknown
 Christopher Báthory, prince of Transylvania (b. 1530)
 Guillaume Postel, French linguist (b. 1510)
 Agatha Streicher, German physician (b. 1520)
 Nicholas Sanders, English Catholic propagandist (b. 1530)

References